Stephen Shelton Bradley (born March 26, 1962 in Middleburg, Virginia) is an internationally successful rider in the equestrian sport of eventing. He has competed internationally since 1989, with great achievements including a place on the US Eventing Team at the 1992 Summer Olympics, and in 1993 he became only the second American to have won the prestigious Burghley Horse Trials.

Bradley had a bad fall at the 1992 Rolex Kentucky Three Day, but returned to competition the following year with several impressive wins.

Some of his best horses include Brandenburg’s Joshua, Sassy Reason, Dr. Dolittle, and Fröm

Achievements
2007
 Team gold medal 2007 Pan American Games (From)
 2nd Jersey Fresh CCI*** (From)

2006
 3rd Rolex Kentucky Three Day (Brandenburg's Joshua)
 1st Poplar Place Advanced Horse Trials

2005
 1st Foxhall Cup CCI*** (Brandenburg's Joshua)

2004
 1st Southern Pines Horse Trials
 3rd Poplar Place Farm March Horse Trials
 5th Rolex Kentucky CCI**** (From)

2003
 40th Burghley Horse Trials CCI**** (From)
 13th Rolex Kentucky CCI**** (From)
 Team Gold at the Pan American Games (Brandenburg's Joshua)

1996
 1st Rolex Kentucky Three Day CCI*** (Dr. Dolittle)

1993
 1st Burghley Horse Trials CCI**** (Sassy Reason)
 Equestrian Athlete of the Year by the US Olympic Committee
 1st Checkmate International Horse Trials CCI***

1992
 52nd Barcelona Olympic Games (Sassy Reason)
 1st Checkmate International Horse Trials CCI***

1991
 1st Checkmate International Horse Trials CCI***

1990
 Combined Training Horseman of the Year by the Chronicle of the Horse
 9th for the U.S. Combined Training Association Horseman of the Year award

References

External links
 

1962 births
Living people
Equestrians at the 1992 Summer Olympics
Olympic equestrians of the United States
American male equestrians
American event riders
Pan American Games gold medalists for the United States
Pan American Games medalists in equestrian
People from Middleburg, Virginia
Equestrians at the 2003 Pan American Games
Equestrians at the 2007 Pan American Games
Medalists at the 2003 Pan American Games
Medalists at the 2007 Pan American Games